Cockle Creek railway station is located on the Main Northern line in New South Wales, Australia. It serves the City of Lake Macquarie suburb of Boolaroo. The station is on the eastern side of Cockle Creek and a balloon loop exists west of the creek for the Teralba Colliery.

History
The station opened on 15 August 1887. It was rebuilt on its present site in 1957 when a new bridge was built immediately south of the station. The station buildings were demolished in March 1993.

The station originally opened with 4 platforms (two side, one island), with the southern track pair being part of the Main Northern Line and the northern track pair part of the former privately owned Caledonian Collieries railway line to West Wallsend, Seahampton, Killingworth, Barnsley and the now vanished town of Fairley, which joined the government line at Cockle Creek. This line carried mixed traffic, including passenger and freight trains, but was largely used for coal traffic until the last working mine, West Wallsend Extended Colliery at Killingworth was closed during an industrial slump in 1962.

Although the area surrounding the railway station was once an industrial area, the eventual station's isolation has led to low patronage (getting just 20 passengers a day in 2013). A large Bunnings Warehouse store opened across the road from the station in 2015, and a new residential development immediately south of the station is finishing completion, but when the large Bunnings store opened, a large roundabout was installed at the nearby intersection, making the pedestrian access to the station dangerous and inconvenient.

Platforms & services
Cockle Creek has two side platforms. It is serviced by NSW TrainLink Central Coast & Newcastle Line services travelling from Sydney Central to Newcastle.

Transport links
Hunter Valley Buses operate two routes via Cockle Creek station:
270: Newcastle University to Toronto West
271: Stockland Glendale to Toronto

Newcastle Transport operates one route via Cockle Creek station:
44: Warners Bay to Kotara via Glendale, Cardiff & Macquarie Hills

References

External links

Cockle Creek station details Transport for New South Wales

Railway stations in the Hunter Region
Railway stations in Australia opened in 1887
Railway stations in Australia opened in 1957
Regional railway stations in New South Wales
Short-platform railway stations in New South Wales, 4 cars
Main North railway line, New South Wales
City of Lake Macquarie